Stewart Duncan  is an American philosopher and associate professor of philosophy at University of Florida. He is known for his expertise on early modern philosophy especially the materialist philosophy of Thomas Hobbes.

Books
 Debates in Modern Philosophy: Essential Readings and Contemporary Responses (Routledge, 2013), edited with Antonia LoLordo,

See also
John Toland 
Margaret Cavendish

References

External links

Stewart Duncan at University of Florida
Duncan's CV

21st-century American philosophers
Philosophy academics
Rutgers University alumni
Alumni of the University of St Andrews
University of Florida faculty
University of Nebraska faculty
Living people
Hobbes scholars
Year of birth missing (living people)